Movement for Humanist Socialism (in Spanish: Movimiento al Socialismo Humanista) is a small political party in La Rioja, Spain.

Political parties in La Rioja (Spain)